Abbotsford Invalid Stout is a beer produced by Carlton & United Breweries. It was named 'Invalid Stout' in 1909 because it was believed it had a high iron content which would have medical benefits.

See also

Australian pub
Beer in Australia
List of breweries in Australia

References

External links
 Our brands | Carlton & United Breweries (CUB)

Australian beer brands
Asahi Breweries
Foster's Group
1864 establishments in Australia
Beer in Australia